Marcantonio Negri (died October 1624) was an Italian composer, singer, and musical director of the early Baroque era. He was in the musical establishment of St. Mark's Basilica in Venice at the same time as Monteverdi, and was well known as a composer at the time.

Life
He was born in Verona, but aside from this, little is known about his life prior to his appointment as assistant maestro di cappella at St. Mark's on 22 December 1612, a position in which he supported Monteverdi as primary maestro di cappella. His first publication dates from 1608, in Venice, so he had some experience as a composer and singer prior to his arrival at St. Mark's; whether he acquired that experience in Verona, Venice, or elsewhere is not known. After four years at St. Mark's, he became abbot of a monastery at Veglia (now Krk, Croatia), on an island off the coast of Dalmatia, a position which still required his part-time involvement at St. Mark's. He resigned from St. Mark's in 1619, and his position was taken by Alessandro Grandi. Negri died at Veglia.

Music and influence
His first book of affetti amorosi (1608) is in the most modern canzonetta style, using affective chromaticism and continuo. In 1611 he published another book of affetti amorosi which includes sonatas for two violins and continuo, as well as some sinfonias. Some of these pieces contain "battle music", with the violins imitating trumpet calls and military drums; both Monteverdi and Grandi imitated this style, and Monteverdi possibly learned it from Negri.

Negri also published sacred music, including a book of psalm settings (1613) and a book of spiritual songs (1618), both in Venice. Stylistically they conform to the typical practice of divided choirs and groups of instruments used by the other composers at St. Mark's (see Venetian polychoral style, concertato).

References
Denis Arnold, "Marc Antonio Negri," in The New Grove Dictionary of Music and Musicians, ed. Stanley Sadie.  20 vol.  London, Macmillan Publishers Ltd., 1980.  
Denis Arnold, Monteverdi.  London, J.M. Dent & Sons Ltd, 1975.  
Eleanor Selfridge-Field, Venetian Instrumental Music, from Gabrieli to Vivaldi.  New York, Dover Publications, 1994.  
Gregorio Moppi: Marc'Antonio Negri Dizionario Biografico degli Italiani

External links
 Marcantonio Negri's page on the International Music Score Library Project

Year of birth missing
1624 deaths
Musicians from Verona
Italian male classical composers
Italian Baroque composers
17th-century Italian composers
17th-century male musicians